Andreyevka is a rural locality (a settlement) in Zerkalsky Selsoviet, Shipunovsky District, Altai Krai, Russia. The population was 203 as of 2013. There are 4 streets.

Geography 
Andreyevka is located 55 km northwest of Shipunovo (the district's administrative centre) by road. Korobeynikovo is the nearest rural locality.

References 

Rural localities in Shipunovsky District